Etelvina Villanueva y Saavedra (1897–1969) was a Bolivian poet and educator. 

In 1923, María Sánchez Bustamante organized the first feminist group in Bolivia El Ateneo Femenino with the goals of attaining civil and political equality as well as furthering their artistic growth. Charter members were artists, journalists, teachers and writers and included Leticia Antezana de Alberti, Elvira Benguria, Fidelia Corral de Sánchez, Marina Lijerón (who would later marry to Betachini), Julia Reyes Ortiz de Cañedo, Ema Alina Palfray, Emma Pérez de Carvajal, María Josefa Saavedra, Ana Rosa Tornero de Bilbao la Vieja, Ana Rosa Vásquez, and Etelvina Villanueva y Saavedra. They organized their own journal "Eco Femenino". From its inception, Tornero ran the magazine printing literary submissions and articles on feminism.

In the 1930s, Villanueva y Saavedra founded another important feminist group, Legión Femenina de Educación Popular de America (Feminine Legion for American Popular Education). This group sought to improve the status of women, regardless of social class, by advocating for changes in the legal code. They provided assistance to the poor and defended unwed mothers and children. They were able to do this because they argued that they were “natural” mothers and so this was a form of mothering but on a higher level and with a new term, "social mothering." In addition to this, the organization allowed Bolivian women to enter the international feminist debates.

References

1897 births
1969 deaths
Bolivian feminists
Bolivian women poets
20th-century Bolivian poets
20th-century women writers
Bolivian educators